Franz Karl Ginzkey (8 September 1871, Pola, Austrian Littoral, Austria-Hungary (now Pula, Croatia) – 11 April 1963, Vienna) was an Austro-Hungarian (then Austrian) officer, poet and writer. His arguably most famous book Hatschi Bratschis Luftballon (Hatschi Bratschi's Balloon) captivated generations of children.

Life
Ginzkey, son of a Bohemian German professional officer of the Austrian Navy, was in the imperial army until 1897. During that period he was intermittently also commander of the as barracks used (Rainer-infantry regiment) Fortress Hohensalzburg. From 1897 to 1914 he worked as a cartographer at the Militärgeographischen Institute (Militarygeographic institute) in Vienna, afterwards in the war archive. Since 1920, he was a retired military member and then worked as a freelance writer. At the time of the Austro-Fascism, he was (for the professional group of artists) from 1934 to 1938 Member of the Council of State and after 1938 came to terms with the leaders of National Socialism and even joined the NSDAP. He was friends with Max Mell and Stefan Zweig, and furthermore with Faistauer Anton and Carl Zuckmayer. Moreover, Ginzkey participated in the founding of the Salzburg Festival and for decades was a member of its board of trustees. Since 1944 he lived in Seewalchen at Lake Attersee.

After the end of war Ginzkeys Die Front in Tirol (The front in Tyrol) (Fischer, Berlin, 1916) was blacklisted in the Soviet zone of occupation. [1]

On his 100th birthday a Franz-Karl-Ginzkey monument was erected in Seewalchen at Lake Attersee.

He rests in a grave of honor at the Vienna Central Cemetery (Group 32 C, Number 25).

Ginzkey is numbered among the circle of newromantic poets and novelists. One of his literary discoverers was Peter Rosegger. A part of his work shows great connection to Salzburg. This witness the following works:

 Wie ich Herr auf Hohensalzburg ward When I was master at Hohensalzburg
 Altsalzburger Bilder nach 10 Federzeichnungen (gemeinsam mit Ulf Seidl ) Altsalzburger images after 10 pen drawings (together with Ulf Seidl)
 Jakobus und die Frauen (1908) Jacob and the Women
 Der seltsame Soldat (1925) The strange soldier
 Der Heimatsucher (1948) The home searcher
 Das Antlitz Salzburgs (1933) The face of Salzburg
 Salzburg und das Salzkammergut (1934) Salzburg and the Salzkammergut
 Prinz Tunora (1934) Prince Tunora
 Salzburg, sein Volk und seine Trachten (1934) Salzburg, its people and its costumes

In 1968 the square between Alpenstraße (Alpine street) and Adolf-Schemel-Straße (Adolf-Schemel street) in the Salzburg district of Salzburg-Süd (Salzburg-South) (Alpinsiedlung) was named in his honor Ginzkeyplatz.

Literary works (a selection)
 Hatschi Bratschis Luftballon, 1904
 Der von der Vogelweide, 1912
 Der Wiesenzaun. Erzählung, 1913 
 Aus der Werkstatt des Lyrikers. Vortrag, 1913
 Den Herren Feinden! Ein Trutz- und Mahnlied, 1914
 Die Front in Tirol, 1916
 Der Gaukler von Bologna, Roman, 1916
 Befreite Stunde. Neue Gedichte, 1917
 Der Doppelspiegel. Betrachtungen und Erzählungen, 1920
 Rositta, 1921
 Der Prinz von Capestrano, 1921
 Von wunderlichen Wegen. 7 Erzählungen, 1922
 Brigitte und Regine, Novelle, 1923
 Die Reise nach Komakuku. Geschichten aus seltsamer Jugend, 1923
 Der Weg zu Oswalda. Erählung, 1924
 Der seltsame Soldat, 1925
 Der Kater Ypsilon. Novellen, 1926
 Der Gott und die Schauspielerin, 1928
 Florians wundersame Reise über die Tapete, 1931
 Drei Frauen. Rosita - Agnete - Oswalda, 1931
 Gespenster auf Hirschberg. Aus der hinterlassenen Handschrift des Majors von Baltram, 1931
 Das verlorene Herz. Ein Märchenspiel, 1931
 Magie des Schicksals. Novelle, 1932
 Das Antlitz Salzburgs, 1933
 Prinz Tunora, Roman, 1934
 Salzburg und das Salzkammergut, 1934
 Salzburg, sein Volk und seine Trachten, 1934
 Liselotte und ihr Ritter oder Warum nicht Romantik?, Roman, 1936
 Sternengast. Neue Gedichte, 1937
 Der selige Brunnen. Eine Raphael Donner-Novelle, 1940
 Meistererzählungen, 1940
 Erschaffung der Eva. Ein epischer Gesang, 1941
 Zeit und Menschen meiner Jugend, 1942
 Taniwani. Ein fröhliches Fischbuch, 1947
 Der Heimatsucher. Ein Leben und eine Sehnsucht, 1948
 Genius Mozart, 1949
 Die Geschichte einer stillen Frau, Roman, 1951
 Der Träumerhansl, 1952
 Altwiener Balladen, 1955
 Der Tanz auf einem Bein. Ein Seitensprung ins Wunderliche, 1956
 Franz Karl Ginzkey. Ausgewählte Werke in vier Bänden, 1960

Decorations and awards
 1921 Adolf Mejstrik Prize for poetry from the German Schiller Foundation
 1932 Honorary doctorate from the University of Vienna
 1941 Ring of Honour of the City of Vienna
 1954 Literary Prize of the City of Vienna
 1957 Grand Austrian State Prize for Literature, with Heimito von Doderer
 1957 Austrian Decoration for Science and Art
 Ring of the city of Salzburg

In 1968, Ginzkeyplatz was named in his honour in the Salzburg district of Salzburg-Süd (Alpensiedlung) between Alpenstrasse und Adolf-Schemel-Strasse. Ginzkey's 100th birthday in 1971 was marked by a Franz-Karl Ginzkey monument on the Attersee Seewalchen.

References

External links
 
 
  Kurzbiografie zu Franz Karl Ginzkey 
  Franz Karl Ginzkey In: Projekt Historischer Roman. Datenbank. Universität Innsbruck. 
 Nachlass von Franz Karl Ginzkey in der Wiener Stadt- und Landesbibliothek 
 Franz-Karl-Ginzkey-Denkmal in Seewalchen am Attersee  

1871 births
1963 deaths
People from Pula
20th-century Austrian dramatists and playwrights
Austrian male dramatists and playwrights
20th-century Austrian novelists
Australian male novelists
Austrian male poets
Austrian children's writers
German Bohemian people
Recipients of the Grand Austrian State Prize
Recipients of the Austrian Decoration for Science and Art
20th-century Austrian male writers